Joseph Harrison (born 6 August 1954) is a Canadian Paralympic athlete.

Harrison was born in Saskatoon. He competed in the 1976 and 1980 Summer Paralympics. In the 1976 Paralympics, he won a gold medal in the men's 100 metres. In the 1980 Paralympics, he won a further gold and silver medal. He later competed in the 1992 and 1994 Winter Paralympics in biathlon and cross-country.

References

1954 births
Living people
Athletes (track and field) at the 1976 Summer Paralympics
Athletes (track and field) at the 1980 Summer Paralympics
Biathletes at the 1994 Winter Paralympics
Cross-country skiers at the 1980 Winter Paralympics
Paralympic gold medalists for Canada
Paralympic silver medalists for Canada
Athletes from Saskatoon
Medalists at the 1976 Summer Paralympics
Medalists at the 1980 Summer Paralympics
Paralympic medalists in athletics (track and field)
Paralympic track and field athletes of Canada
Canadian male sprinters